Anton Krysanov (born March 25, 1987) is a Russian professional ice hockey player. He is currently an unrestricted free agent who most recently played with Tsen Tou Jilin City in the Supreme Hockey League (VHL). He was drafted 148th overall in the fifth round of the 2005 NHL Entry Draft by the Phoenix Coyotes.

Career statistics

Regular season and playoffs

International

References

External links

RussianProspects.com Anton Krysanov's Player Profile

1987 births
Living people
Amur Khabarovsk players
Avtomobilist Yekaterinburg players
HC Dynamo Moscow players
HC Lada Togliatti players
Arizona Coyotes draft picks
HC Neftekhimik Nizhnekamsk players
Russian ice hockey centres
Sportspeople from Tolyatti
Tsen Tou Jilin City players
HC Yugra players
HC Vityaz players